The 1983 All-Ireland Senior Hurling Championship was the 97th staging of the All-Ireland Senior Hurling Championship, the Gaelic Athletic Association's premier inter-county hurling tournament. The draw for the 1980 fixtures took place in September 1979. The championship began on 29 May 1983 and ended on 4 September 1983.

Kilkenny were the defending champions.

On 4 September 1983, Kilkenny won the championship following a 2–14 to 2–12 defeat of Cork in the All-Ireland final. This was their 23rd All-Ireland title and their second in succession.

Kilkenny's Billy Fitzpatrick was the championship's top scorer with 1-24. Kilkenny's Frank Cummins was the choice for Texaco Hurler of the Year.

Format

The provincial championships in Munster and Leinster were all played on a knock-out basis as usual.  In keeping with the rotation system for advancement to the All-Ireland final, the Leinster champions automatically qualified for the final of 1983.  Galway, having no competition in the Connacht Championship, played the winners of a preliminary game between Kerry and Antrim.  The winners of this quarter-final went on to play the Munster champions in a single All-Ireland semi-final.

Fixtures

Leinster Senior Hurling championship

Munster Senior Hurling championship

All-Ireland Senior Hurling Championship

Championship statistics

Miscellaneous

 Tipperary's victory over Clare in the Munster quarter-final was the team's first in the provincial championship since 1973.
 The attendance of 20,816 at the Munster final was the lowest at the provincial decider since 1972.
 In the All-Ireland final two Kilkenny players achieved rare distinctions.  Goalkeeper Noel Skehan won a record-breaking ninth All-Ireland medal, however, his first three were won as non-playing substitutes.  Midfielder Frank Cummins won his seventh All-Ireland medal on the field of play, equalling the record of four other Kilkenny players from the early part of the century.  It was his eighth winners' medal overall as he won a non-playing substitutes' medal in 1967.  Cummins also joined a unique group of players who won All-Ireland medals in three different decades.

Top scorers

Season

Single game

Broadcasting

The following matches were broadcast live on television in Ireland on RTÉ.

External links
All-Ireland Senior Hurling Championship 1983 at GAA Info

1983